Schizomus cambridgei is a species of short-tailed whipscorpions of the Schizomus genus that belong to the Hubbardiidae family of Arachnids.

References 

Schizomida